Robert Murray (born 31 October 1974) is an English former professional footballer. Murray, who was born in Hammersmith, played as a defender for A.F.C. Bournemouth.

He grow-up in Waterlooville, Hampshire.

Murray began his career at Bournemouth in 1992 straight from school as an apprentice. He spent 8 years with Bournemouth, recording 171 appearances and 14 goals. He holds the Bournemouth club record for youngest appearance in the first team on 15 September 1992 against Blackpool away. Murray was released by Bournemouth at the end of the 1997–98 season. He subsequently joined the Richmond Kickers, where he played 65 games and scored 25 goals. At the end of the 1999–2000 season, Murray signed for Dorchester Town on a 2-year contract.

References

External links

Scotland U21 stats

1974 births
Living people
Footballers from Hammersmith
Association football defenders
English footballers
AFC Bournemouth players
Richmond Kickers players
Dorchester Town F.C. players
English Football League players
English expatriate footballers
Expatriate soccer players in the United States
Scotland under-21 international footballers
Scottish expatriate sportspeople in the United States
Scottish expatriate footballers
English expatriate sportspeople in the United States